Luke Timothy Grimes (born January 21, 1984) is an American actor. He is known for his role as real life Navy SEAL Marc Alan Lee in the acclaimed film American Sniper. He played Christian Grey's brother, Elliot, in the film Fifty Shades of Grey (2015), and its sequels, Fifty Shades Darker (2017) and Fifty Shades Freed (2018). He currently stars in the drama series Yellowstone (2018–present).

Early life
Grimes was born in Dayton, Ohio, the son of a Pentecostal pastor. Grimes graduated from Dayton Christian High School in 2002. He moved to New York City to study acting at the American Academy of Dramatic Arts.

Career
Grimes has appeared in All the Boys Love Mandy Lane, War Eagle, Arkansas, and Assassination of a High School President, which received a limited release in March 2009. He also appeared in the ABC drama Brothers & Sisters, as Ryan Lafferty, the illegitimate son of William Walker, patriarch of the show's family. Beginning with Season 4, he became a series regular.

He starred in the 2010 FX movie pilot, Outlaw Country, with Haley Bennett and Mary Steenburgen. Grimes played a cowboy named Eli Larkin. The series was not picked up by FX, but the pilot aired on August 23, 2012 as a television movie. In 2012, he appeared in the Liam Neeson thriller Taken 2 as Neeson's daughter's boyfriend.

Grimes portrayed James in True Blood for six episodes during the show's sixth season, but later left the show. Reports, confirmed by BuzzFeed, indicated that he quit because he refused to participate in same-sex kissing or sex scenes or to play a character that was attracted to men. Grimes's publicist stated that he departed to pursue other opportunities. 

Grimes played United States Navy SEAL Marc Lee, who was killed in action in 2006, in American Sniper (2014). He played Christian Grey's brother, Elliot, in the film Fifty Shades of Grey (2015), and its sequels, Fifty Shades Darker (2017) and Fifty Shades Freed (2018). Grimes played Todd Belkin in Freeheld (2015). Since 2018, he has starred alongside Kevin Costner in the Paramount Network drama series Yellowstone in the role of Kayce Dutton.

Filmography

Film

Television

References

External links
 
 
 

1984 births
Living people
21st-century American male actors
American Academy of Dramatic Arts alumni
American male film actors
American male television actors
Male actors from Dayton, Ohio